is one of the techniques adopted later by the Kodokan into their Shinmeisho No Waza (newly accepted techniques) list. It is categorized as a foot technique, Ashi-waza. This technique is a reversal, or counter-throw meant to counteract Ouchi gari Judo throw.

Technique Description 
Animation
from
www.judoinfo.com

Similar Techniques, Variants, and Aliases

Included Systems 
Judo

Technique History

External links
Judo Techniques by type.
Judo Lists by rank.

Judo technique